Artanema longifolium is an edible flowering plant species found in tropical Africa, India and South-East Asia. Extracts are used in Ayurveda medicines to treat myositis and nausea. The leaves can also be cooked and eaten as a leafy vegetable. The roots are root used to treat rheumatism, diarrhea, syphilis and ophthalmitis.

References

Linderniaceae